4444 may refer to:
4444 Escher, a main-beltasteroid
Four fours, a mathematical puzzle
The Fours, a New Brunswick, NJ - based rock group
ProRes 4444, a video codec developed by Apple Inc.
A year in the 5th millennium
4-4-4-4, a type of steam locomotive